KVAM may refer to:

 KVAM (FM), a radio station (88.1 FM) licensed to serve Cheyenne, Wyoming, United States
 KFBU, a radio station (1630 AM) licensed to serve Fox Farm, Wyoming, which held the call sign KVAM from 2021 to 2022
 KXJJ, a radio station (1570 AM) licensed to serve Loveland, Colorado, United States, which held the call sign KVAM from 2016 to 2021
 KBUD (FM), a radio station (93.7 FM) licensed to serve Deer Trail, Colorado, which held the call sign KVAM from 2015 to 2016
 KBHM, a radio station (88.3 FM) licensed to serve Kimball, Nebraska, United States, which held the call sign KVAM from 2010 to 2015